Valeri Nikolayevich Chizhov (born 14 April 1975) is a Russian football coach and a former goalkeeper. He works as a goalkeeping coach with FC Shakhtyor Soligorsk in Belarus.

Honours
 Russian Premier League winner: 1992, 1994.
 Top 33 players year-end list: 2002.
 Russian Second Division, Zone Center best goalkeeper: 2009.

International career
Chizhov played his only game for Russia on 12 February 2003 in a friendly against Cyprus.

References
  Profile

1975 births
Footballers from Moscow
Living people
Russian footballers
Association football goalkeepers
Soviet Union youth international footballers
Russia international footballers
Russian Premier League players
FC Spartak Moscow players
FC Saturn Ramenskoye players
FC Rubin Kazan players
FC Sibir Novosibirsk players
FC Vityaz Podolsk players
FC Avangard Kursk players
FC Neftekhimik Nizhnekamsk players
FC Dynamo Bryansk players
FC Spartak-2 Moscow players